Pseudophilautus macropus, commonly known as the bigfoot shrub frog, is a species of frog in the family Rhacophoridae. It is endemic to Sri Lanka.

Its natural habitats are subtropical or tropical moist lowland forests and plantations.
It is threatened by habitat loss.

References

macropus
Frogs of Sri Lanka
Endemic fauna of Sri Lanka
Amphibians described in 1868
Taxa named by Albert Günther
Taxonomy articles created by Polbot